Sun Xiaojiao (孙晓姣, born 18 December 1984 in Zhejiang) is a former Chinese artistic gymnast. She was the bronze medalist on the balance beam at the 2001 World Championships. At the 2001 Goodwill games in Brisbane, she was the balance beam champion.

References 

Chinese female artistic gymnasts
Medalists at the World Artistic Gymnastics Championships
1984 births
Living people
Asian Games medalists in gymnastics
Gymnasts at the 2002 Asian Games
Asian Games gold medalists for China
Medalists at the 2002 Asian Games
Gymnasts from Zhejiang
Competitors at the 2001 Goodwill Games
Goodwill Games medalists in gymnastics